Buffalo Soldier Hill is a summit, a hill, in Roosevelt County, New Mexico, in the United States.

The summit was the scene of the Buffalo Soldier tragedy of 1877, from which it takes its name. Old variant names were Nigger Hill, and Dead Negro Hill. The current name of the hill was approved by the United States Board on Geographic Names around 2005. 

Dead Negro Draw in Texas was likely named in memory of the same event.

References

Landforms of Roosevelt County, New Mexico
Hills of New Mexico